"Fireball" is  a song by American recording artist Dev, released as a promotional single. It was produced by The Cataracs. A music video was released on May 31, 2011 and features Dev on a bike. The Cataracs also appear in the video.

Track listings
Digital download
"Fireball" – 3:07

Digital EP – The Remixes
"Fireball" (Original) – 3:07
"Fireball" (Dillon Francis Remix) – 3:18
"Fireball" (Mexicans With Guns Remix) – 3:33
"Fireball" (DJ Wool Remix) – 8:56
"Fireball" (Eli Smith Remix) - 5:21

Release history

References

Dev (singer) songs
Song recordings produced by the Cataracs
Songs written by David Singer-Vine
Songs written by Kshmr
2010 songs
Music videos directed by Colin Tilley
Songs written by Dev (singer)
2009 singles